League of Legends esports is the professional competition of the multiplayer online battle arena video game League of Legends. It is developed and published by Riot Games and was first released in 2009.

Professional tournaments began in 2011 with the Season 1 World Championship at DreamHack in Jönköping, Sweden. The latest major tournament was the 2022 League of Legends World Championship.

Tournaments 

League of Legends is one of the largest esports with various annual tournaments taking place worldwide. In terms of esports professional gaming as of June 2016, League of Legends has had $29,203,916 USD in prize money, 4,083 Players, and 1,718 tournaments, compared to Dota 2's US$64,397,286 of prize money, 1,495 players, and 613 tournaments.

World Championship

Seasons 1–3 
The Season 1 World Championship was held at DreamHack in Sweden in June 2011 and had US$100,000 in prizes. The European team Fnatic defeated teams from Europe, the US, and Southeast Asia to win the tournament and received US$50,000 in prize money. Over 1.6 million viewers watched the streamed broadcast of the event, with a peak of over 210,000 simultaneous viewers in one semi-final match. After Season 1, Riot announced that US$5,000,000 would be paid out over Season 2. Of this amount, $2 million was to go to Riot's partners, including the IPL and other major esports associations. Another $2 million was to go to Riot's Season 2 qualifiers and championship. The final $1 million was to go to small organizers who apply to Riot to host League of Legends tournaments.

After a series of network issues during the Season 2 World Playoffs that led to several matches being delayed, Riot revealed on October 13, 2012, that a special LAN-based client had been quickly developed, designed for use in tournament environments where the effects of lag and other network issues can be detrimental to the proper organization of an event. The LAN client was deployed for the first time during the first quarter-final and semi-final matches played following the rescheduled matches, and was in use during the finals. On October 13, 2012, the Taipei Assassins (TPA) of Taiwan triumphed over Azubu Frost of South Korea in the Finals of Season 2 World Championship with a score of 3 to 1, and claimed the $1 million in prize money.

In October 2013, Korean team SK Telecom T1 and Chinese team Royal Club competed at the Season 3 World Championship at the Staples Center in Los Angeles. SK Telecom T1 won the grand prize of $1 million, and Royal Club received $250,000.

On July 11, 2013, Riot Games announced that the United States Citizenship and Immigration Services recognized League of Legends pro-players as professional athletes and that the P visa application process would be more simplified for them. These changes allowed professional players to stay in the United States for up to five years. Despite these reforms, there have still been a number of visa problems that have occurred for players in the LCS and other LoL tournaments entering the United States.

2014–2016 
Silversmith Thomas Lyte was asked to craft the winner trophy for the 2014 games, having already created the Season Two World Championship Cup in 2012. Riot Games, which owns League of Legends, commissioned the Summoner's Cup and specified that it should weigh 70 pounds. However, the weight was later reduced as it was too heavy to be lifted in victory.

The 2013 tournament had a grand prize of $1 million and attracted 32 million viewers online. The 2014 and 2015 tournaments each gave out one of the largest total prize pools in esports history, at $2.3 million. The 2016 World Championship's total prize pool was over $5 million, with over $2 million going over to the winner of the tournament.  In October 2015, SK Telecom T1 became the first-ever two-time World Champion when they defeated fellow Korean team KOO Tigers with a score of 3 to 1 in the best-of-five finals in Berlin, Germany.  SK Telecom T1 repeated their feat in October 2016, defeating fellow Korean team Samsung Galaxy 3–2 in the 2016 World Championship.  The 2016 tournament was also notable for introducing "Fan contributions" to the prize pool; a certain percentage of purchases from Riot's store over the preceding months of the tournament went to increasing the prizes for the 16 competing teams in the tournament.

2017–2020 
The 2017 tournament, hosted in China, also grew a considerable prize pool of roughly $5 million. Riot once again in 2017 decided to take profits from skin sales to increase the prize pool. The initial pool was $2 million and 250 thousand dollars, however, Championship Ashe, the new championship skin for 2017, sold well. 25% of Championship Ashe and ward sales allowed the prize pool to grow. 24 teams battled until only SK Telecom T1 and Samsung Galaxy were the last 2 teams standing. Samsung Galaxy won dominantly with a 3–0 against SK Telecom T1 in the Beijing National Stadium (Bird's Nest), allowing Samsung Galaxy to take home the 1st place prize pool of $1.8 million. The 2018 tournament, hosted in South Korea, was the chance for Riot to continue to exceed expectations. Riot, as was tradition now, took 12.5% of Championship Kha'Zix and ward sales to increase the prize pool. The other 12.5% was decided to be divided among all participating teams of the tournament. The prize pool rose compared from last year's $5 million to roughly $6.5 million. The finals were held in The Munhak Stadium in Incheon, where Fnatic faced off against Invictus Gaming Invictus Gaming would go on to 3–0 sweep Fnatic to take home the 1st place prize pool of $2.4 million. This would be Invictus Gaming's first World Championship Win, and also the first time a Chinese Team would win a World Championship. The 2019 tournament, hosted in Europe, lead to another clean sweep match. FunPlus Phoenix, a team made in 2017 faced off and took a 3–0 victory from the well established European team, G2 Esports in AccorHotels Arena in Paris, France, winning roughly 800 thousand dollars from the prize pool.

The 2020 tournament began on September 25 in China, and the final was held in the Pudong Football Stadium on October 31.

2021 

The 2021 tournament began on October 5 in Reykjavík, where all the games were played offline without a live audience due to the impact of the COVID-19 pandemic.

Mid-Season Invitational 
The Mid-Season Invitational (MSI) is an annual League of Legends tournament hosted by publisher Riot Games since 2015. It is the second most important international League of Legends tournament aside from the World Championship.

Championship Series 

On February 7, 2013, Riot Games created the League of Legends Championship Series (LCS) in Europe and North America. This is a league system where ten teams compete. A season consists of two splits, with each split separated into a regular season and playoffs. The top teams from each region advance to the World Championship at the end of the season.

Regional leagues 

In late 2018, the European League of Legends Championship Series (EU LCS) was renamed to the League of Legends European Championship (LEC). The North American League of Legends Championship Series (NA LCS) also dropped "North American" from its name, and was renamed to simply the League Championship Series ahead of the 2021 season. Equivalent leagues, run by Riot and local publishers, also exist in other regions such as the Pro League (LPL) in China by Tencent, Champions Korea (LCK) in South Korea, the Pacific Championship Series (PCS) in Taiwan/Hong Kong/Macau/Southeast Asia and the Vietnam Championship Series (VCS) by Garena, the Campeonato Brasileiro (CBLOL) in Brazil, the Continental League (LCL) in the Commonwealth of Independent States, the Japan League (LJL), the Liga Latinoamérica (LLA) in Latin America, the Turkish Championship League (TCL) in Turkey and the Circuit Oceania (LCO) by ESL Australia and Guinevere Capital.

References

External links